Kevin Shum (born July 3, 1997) is an American figure skater. He competed at the 2015 World Junior Championships and qualified for the free skate.

Personal life 
Shum was born on July 3, 1997 in Walnut Creek, California. He graduated from Massachusetts Institute of Technology in 2019 with a degree in computer science and engineering, where he also worked as an admissions blogger. He researched at the MIT Media Lab, taught STEM in Germany with the MIT International Science and Technology Initiatives Global Teaching Labs, and studied on exchange at ETH Zurich in Switzerland. He has also worked as a software engineer at Microsoft on the  Azure cloud computing platform.

Career 
Shum began learning to skate in 2003. His international debut came in March 2014 at the International Challenge Cup in The Hague, Netherlands. In September of the same year, he made his first Junior Grand Prix (JGP) appearance, placing 7th in Aichi, Japan.

After winning the junior silver medal at the 2015 U.S. Championships, Shum was assigned to the 2015 World Junior Championships in Tallinn, Estonia. He qualified for the free skate after placing 16th in the short program and went on to finish 20th overall.

While a full-time student at MIT, he won the 2017 and 2018 U.S. Collegiate Figure Skating Championships. 

Shum is coached by Peter Johansson and Mark Mitchell at the Skating Club of Boston.

Programs

Competitive highlights

2013–present
JGP: ISU Junior Grand Prix

Juvenile to novice levels

References

External links 
 
 

1997 births
American male single skaters
Living people
Sportspeople from Walnut Creek, California